Sokołowo may refer to:

Sokołowo, Brodnica County in Kuyavian-Pomeranian Voivodeship (north-central Poland)
Sokołowo, Golub-Dobrzyń County in Kuyavian-Pomeranian Voivodeship (north-central Poland)
Sokołowo, Gmina Izbica Kujawska in Kuyavian-Pomeranian Voivodeship (north-central Poland)
Sokołowo, Podlaskie Voivodeship (north-east Poland)
Sokołowo, Ciechanów County in Masovian Voivodeship (east-central Poland)
Sokołowo, Ostrołęka County in Masovian Voivodeship (east-central Poland)
Sokołowo, Czarnków-Trzcianka County in Greater Poland Voivodeship (west-central Poland)
Sokołowo, Gniezno County in Greater Poland Voivodeship (west-central Poland)
Sokołowo, Koło County in Greater Poland Voivodeship (west-central Poland)
Sokołowo, Września County in Greater Poland Voivodeship (west-central Poland)

See also
Sokolovo (disambiguation), South Slavic toponym